Alić is a Bosnian patronymic surname formed by adding the Slavic diminutive suffix -ić to the common male Muslim name Ali (thus literally meaning "(little) son of Ali") and may refer to:

  (born 1970), Bosnian writer
  (born 1984), Bosnian footballer
 Božidar Alić (1954–2020), Croatian actor
 Dijana Alić (born 19??), Bosnian architect and academic who lives in Australia
 Derviš-beg Alić Sarvanović (fl. 1597), Ottoman governor of the sanjak of Montenegro
  (born 1947), Bosnian writer
 Enes Alić (born 1999), Bosnian footballer
 Ermin Alić (born 1992),  Montenegrin footballer
 Fikret Alić (born 19??), Bosniak survivor of the 1992 Keraterm and Trnopolje concentration camps
 Hamza Alić (born 1979), Bosnian shot putter
 , Croatian politician
  born Jasmina Alić (born 1941), Bosnian Writer
  (1906-1982), Bosnian songwriter
  (born 1956), Croatian philosopher and writer
 Sedin Alić (born 1989), Danish born Bosnian footballer

See also 

 Alići (Montenegro)
 Alići (Bosnia)

Bosnian surnames